Sokilnyky is a village in Sievierodonetsk Raion (district) in Luhansk Oblast of eastern Ukraine, at about 30.0 km NW from the centre of Luhansk city.

The settlement was taken under control of pro-Russian forces during the War in Donbass, that started in 2014.

Demographics
In 2001 the settlement had 377 inhabitants. Native language distribution as of the Ukrainian Census of 2001:
Ukrainian: 19.63%
Russian: 80.37%

References

Villages in Sievierodonetsk Raion